Stuart Harris-Logan (often credited as 'Stuart A. Harris-Logan') is a Celticist, folklorist and writer living in Scotland, UK. He is the author of Singing With Blackbirds (2006). He works as Keeper of Archives & Collections at the Royal Conservatoire of Scotland.

See also
Poetry of Scotland
Scottish folklore

References

External links
 Singing With Blackbirds

Living people
Scottish folklorists
21st-century Scottish writers
Year of birth missing (living people)
Place of birth missing (living people)